Ōtani-ha (真宗大谷派, Shinshū Ōtani-ha) is a Japanese Buddhist movement. It belongs to Jōdo Shinshū, also known as Shin Buddhism. The movement has approximately 5.5 million members.

The headquarters of Ōtani-ha are in Kyoto, the mother temple is Higashi Honganji. The historic Shōman-ji, Nagoya also belongs to it.

Otani University in Kyoto belongs to Ōtani-ha.

See also
Hongan-ji
Pure land Buddhism
Shinran

References

Bibliography
 Suzuki, David A. (1985), Crisis in Japanese Buddhism : case of the Otani Sect, Los Angeles : Buddhist Books International, 

Shinshū Ōtani-ha
Schools of Jōdo Shinshū